The RS900 is a 2.8m, double handed, dual trapeze, racing skiff. Designed in 2012 by Phil Morrison and manufactured by RS Sailing. It has a lightweight polyester GRP with carbon reinforcement hull construction.

It was RS Sailings contender for the Women's Olympic Skiff. After the ISAF’s evaluation trials, the Olympic committee chose the 49er FX over the RS900.

It was designed to be sailed by a crew weighing between 110 and 130 kg.

References

External links
 RS Sailing (Global HQ)

Dinghies
Boats designed by Phil Morrison
2010s sailboat type designs
Sailboat types built by RS Sailing